Breznë is a village in the south of Kosovo, in the municipality of Dragash, located the Opolje region of the Šar Mountains.

Notes

References 

Villages in Dragash